Diuris pulchella, commonly called the beautiful donkey orchid is a species of orchid that is endemic to the south-eastern part of the south-west of Western Australia. It has two or three leaves at its base and up to five bright yellow and mauve flowers described as "exquisite", "spectacular" and "attractive". It grows in shallow soil on granite outcrops near Esperance.

Description
There is a single yellow, ridge-like callus occupying about one-third of the length of the labellum near its base. Flowering occurs in August and September.

Taxonomy and naming
Diuris pulchella was first formally described in 1991 by David Jones from a specimen collected in the Mount Ney Nature Reserve, and the description was published in Australian Orchid Review. The specific epithet (pulchella) is the diminutive form of the Latin word pulcher meaning "beautiful" hence "beautiful little", referring to the "highly colourful and attractive flowers". Other authors have described the flowers as "exquisite" or "spectacular".

Distribution and habitat
The beautiful donkey orchid grows usually in shallow soil on and around granite outcrops and is found between Salmon Gums, Esperance and Balladonia in the Coolgardie, Esperance Plains and Mallee biogeographic regions.

Conservation
Diuris pulchella is classified as "not threatened" by the Western Australian Government Department of Environment and Conservation (Western Australia).

References

pulchella
Endemic orchids of Australia
Orchids of Western Australia
Endemic flora of Western Australia
Plants described in 1991